Messenger of the Gods: The Singles is a compilation album of Freddie Mercury's singles. It was released three days before what would have been Mercury's 70th birthday.

As well as a two-CD compilation album, the album has been released on a 13-vinyl box set reproducing singles on 7" vinyl and the same artwork. The earliest single issued is The Beach Boys song "I Can Hear Music" and the last single in chronological order is the No More Brothers remix of "Living on My Own".

CD Track listing

Disc one: The Singles

Disc two: The B-Sides

Coloured 7" vinyl box set
Disc 1 (Blue)
Side A: "I Can Hear Music" (Larry Lurex)
Side B: "Goin' Back" (Larry Lurex)

Disc 2 (Orange)
Side A: "Love Kills"

Disc 3 (Yellow)
Side A: "I Was Born to Love You"
Side B: "Stop All The Fighting"

Disc 4 (Red)
Side A: "Made in Heaven (Single Remix)"
Side B: "She Blows Hot and Cold"
Released in 1985

Disc 5 (White)
Side A: "Living on My Own (Single Edit)"
Side B: "My Love Is Dangerous"

Disc 6 (Red)
Side A: "Love Me Like There's No Tomorrow"
Side B: "Let's Turn It On"

Disc 7 (Cyan)
Side A: "Time"
Side B: "Time (Instrumental)"

Disc 8 (Orange)
Side A: "The Great Pretender"
Side B: "Exercises in Free Love (Freddie's Vocal)"

Disc 9 (Clear)
Side A: "Barcelona (Single Version)"
Side B: "Exercises in Free Love (Montserrat's Vocal)"

Disc 10 (Gold)
Side A: "The Golden Boy (Single Edit)"
Side B: "The Fallen Priest"

Disc 11 (Green)
Side A: "How Can I Go On (Single Version)"
Side B: "Overture Piccante"

Disc 12 (Neon Pink)
Side A: "In My Defence"
Side B: "Love Kills (Wolf Euro Mix)"

Disc 13 (Yellow)
Side A: "Living on My Own (No More Brothers Remix)"
Side B: "Living on My Own (Julian Raymond Album Mix)"

Charts

References

Freddie Mercury albums
2016 greatest hits albums
Music video compilation albums
Mercury Records remix albums
Mercury Records video albums
Mercury Records compilation albums
Compilation albums published posthumously
Albums recorded at Trident Studios